= The Tombs of Valla =

Role-playing game

The Tombs of Valla is a 1980 role-playing game adventure published by John Scott Clegg.

== Contents ==
The Tombs of Valla is an adventure in which the King of Mooria keeps the Tombs of Valla well guarded.

== Publication history ==
The Tombs of Valla was written and published by John Scott Clegg in 1980 as a digest-sized 68-page book with four maps.

== Reception ==
Jeromy Wolfe reviewed The Tombs of Valla for Different Worlds magazine and stated that "This booklet and map set are a valuable part of my collection. I can easily modify it to serve as a similar complex in many parts of my campaign by using the alternate beasts and by substituting different guards and treasures. All the random tables needed are in· eluded, making this simple. I have found that playing it has been an enjoyable and exciting experience."
